Guo Mingyue (Simplified Chinese: 郭明月) (born 7 March 1986 in Dalian) is a Chinese football player who plays as a defender or midfielder.

Club career
Guo Mingyue originally began his football career by playing with the various Shandong Luneng youth teams. He was however unable to graduate to the senior team and by the end of the 2006 league season was allowed to leave the club. He would join top-tier side Wuhan Optics Valley in series of deals that brought him to Wuhan with fellow Shandong players Ren Yongshun, Li Zhuangfei and Deng Xiaofei. He would soon go on to make his league debut on April 21, 2007 against Shenzhen Shangqingyin in a 2-1 defeat. As the season went along the club's manager Pei Encai would be dismissed, this would cause some bad relationships between the local players against most of the Shandong players in the team to be exposed, this saw the Shandong players except Deng Xiaofei to be purged out of the club at the end of the season.

Guo would transfer to second-tier club Jiangsu Sainty and be re-united with the manager from Wuhan Pei Encai at the beginning of the 2008 league season while also being awarded the No.6 jersey. He would go on to make his debut on April 20, 2008 against Sichuan FC in a 1-0 defeat. In his first season with Jiangsu Sainty Guo would receive two league appearances, however it was enough for him to aid the club to win the division  title at the end of the season. Back within the top tier Guo would be a squad player as Jiangsu Sainty became mid-table regulars, however after being unable gain more playing time he was allowed to transfer to third-tier club Chongqing F.C. on July in the 2011 Chinese league season. At Chongqing, Guo would play in seventeen games as the club reached the division play-off final where he would personally miss a penalty that saw Harbin Songbei Yiteng win the title, however despite this his club would still gain promotion to the second tier.

In 2015, Guo signed for Shenzhen Renren. On 19 February 2019, Guo transferred to League Two side Zibo Cuju.

National team
As a youngster Guo Mingyue would be called to the Chinese U-17 National Team and would be included in the squad that competed in 2003 FIFA U-17 World Championship. During the tournament he would receive no playing time while he saw China knocked out during the group stage.

Career statistics 
Statistics accurate as of match played 31 December 2020.

Honours

Club
Jiangsu Sainty
China League One: 2008

References

External links
Player stats at sports.sohu.com

1986 births
Living people
Chinese footballers
Footballers from Dalian
Shandong Taishan F.C. players
Wuhan Guanggu players
Jiangsu F.C. players
Chinese Super League players
China League One players
Association football defenders
Association football midfielders